Le Petit Marocain was a daily publication founded during the protectorate-era in Morocco and the predecessor publication of Le Matin.

History and profile
Le Petit Marocain was founded in 1925 and was based in Casablanca. The paper belonged to the company "Mas Presse" which was controlled by French nationals Pierre Mas and Yves Mas. 

Its editorial line was ultra-colonialist, and it actively sought the promotion of the colonial policies of France in the country and it notably supported the Vichy government and the deposition and exile of Mohammed V. 

The newspaper ceased on 1 November 1972 when the control of "Mas presse" was given to Moulay Hafid Alaoui, cousin of Hassan II and minister of information during that time. It was replaced, on the same day, by Le Matin, a daily dedicated to the promotion of the image of the Moroccan King; its purchase was compulsory for all state administrations.

References

External link 
 Digitized issues of Le Petit Marocain in Gallica, the digital library of the BnF. 

1925 establishments in Morocco
1972 disestablishments in Morocco
Publications established in 1925
Publications disestablished in 1972
French-language newspapers published in Morocco
Defunct newspapers published in Morocco
Mass media in Casablanca